Wolfgang Gunkel (15 January 1948 – 20 May 2020) was an East German rower who mostly competed in coxed pairs together with Jörg Lucke. In this event he won the European title in 1971, the Olympic gold medal in 1972, and the world title in 1975. His crew placed fourth at the 1968 Olympics. Gunkel won another world title in the men's eight in 1977. In February 1978, he was given the sports awards Honoured Master of Sports.

In the early 1970s, he married fellow international rower Renate Boesler.

References

External links
 
 
 

1948 births
2020 deaths
People from East Berlin
Rowers from Berlin
East German male rowers
Olympic rowers of East Germany
Rowers at the 1968 Summer Olympics
Rowers at the 1972 Summer Olympics
Olympic gold medalists for East Germany
Olympic medalists in rowing
World Rowing Championships medalists for East Germany
Medalists at the 1972 Summer Olympics
21st-century German politicians
Recipients of the Patriotic Order of Merit in silver
Recipients of the Honoured Master of Sport
European Rowing Championships medalists